Yang Xian (d. 1370), born Yang Bi, courtesy name Xiwu, was a Chinese politician of the Ming dynasty, part of the East Zhe (Zhedong) faction (Liu Ji).

Li Shanchang accused Yang Xian of treason and adultery. Zhu Yuanzhang then executed Yang. Zhu also executed Li Shanchang and his entire family too. Yang Xian was close to Liu Bowen, but Zhu poisoned Liu to death.

See also
Liu Ji
Hu Weiyong
Li Shanchang
Wang Guangyang
Four Major Cases of the early Ming dynasty

References 

Year of birth unknown
1370 deaths
14th-century executions
Executed Ming dynasty people.
Executed people from Shanxi
Ming dynasty politicians
People executed by dismemberment
People executed by the Ming dynasty
Politicians from Taiyuan
Yuan dynasty people